KJEZ (99.5 FM) is a radio station airing a classic rock format licensed to Poplar Bluff, Missouri.  The station is owned by Max Media, through licensee MRR License LLC.

References

External links

Classic rock radio stations in the United States
JEZ
Radio stations established in 1977
1977 establishments in Missouri
Max Media radio stations